Mr. Big is a 2007 documentary directed and produced by Tiffany Burns and edited by Alec MacNeill Richardson. The documentary examines the "Mr. Big" undercover methods used by the Royal Canadian Mounted Police (RCMP). In these operations, RCMP officers pose as high-ranking gang criminals and develop relationships with the target  involved. This is deliberate, as the relationship that is forged is ultimately used to determine what knowledge the target has of the crime(s) being investigated. "Mr. Big" operations have been credited with securing difficult convictions in a large number of cases, such as United States v. Burns, R v. Hart, and R v. Grandinetti, but concerns have been raised that they involve a risk of false confessions and wrongful convictions. Mr. Big includes interviews with targets of "Mr. Big" operations and their families, such as the Burns family, as well as interviews with various professionals who have an interest in the "Mr. Big" tactics, and RCMP footage of "Mr. Big" operations.

Cast
Glen Sebastian Burns as himself
Tiffany Burns as herself
Donna Larsen as herself
Atif Rafay as himself

References

External links 
 
 
 Program note, Vancouver International Film Festival

Canadian documentary films
Documentary films about organized crime
Documentary films about law enforcement in Canada
Royal Canadian Mounted Police
2007 documentary films
2007 films
Works about organized crime in Canada
2000s English-language films
2000s Canadian films